Marcin Kowalczyk (born 9 April 1985) is a Polish former professional footballer who played as a defender.

Career

Club
In early 2006 Kowalczyk joined GKS Bełchatów, where he played for two years. On 26 February 2008 he signed with Dynamo Moscow. In March 2011, he was loaned to Metalurh Donetsk.

In August 2011, he joined Zagłębie Lubin on a one-year contract.

International
He made his first appearance for the Polish national team in a friendly against Ukraine on 20 August 2008.

References

External links
 
 
 
 

1985 births
Living people
People from Wieruszów
Polish footballers
Polish expatriate footballers
Expatriate footballers in Russia
Expatriate footballers in Ukraine
Poland international footballers
Stal Głowno players
ŁKS Łódź players
GKS Bełchatów players
FC Dynamo Moscow players
FC Metalurh Donetsk players
Zagłębie Lubin players
Śląsk Wrocław players
FC Volga Nizhny Novgorod players
FC Tosno players
Ruch Chorzów players
GKS Tychy players
Ekstraklasa players
I liga players
Russian Premier League players
Ukrainian Premier League players
Sportspeople from Łódź Voivodeship
Polish expatriate sportspeople in Russia
Polish expatriate sportspeople in Ukraine
Association football defenders